Manuel Schleis (*1979) is a German music producer.

About 

He worked together with DJ Manuel Reuter (DJ Manian, danceformation Cascada, also Spencer & Hill) and has produced many club hits and remixes for Sugababes, Moby, Scooter (band), Axwell, Public Enemy, and Tiësto.
He is also a developer of audio music software as well as being a sound designer. 
Under the company name "Vengeance-Sound" he releases Soundsets / Sample CDs. As a sound designer for Access Music Electronics, Roland Music, Waldorf synthesizer, Propellerheads, Tone2 & reFX Manuel Schleis works as well. In 2016 his new line of VST Plugins, called "Vengeance Producer Suite", was released (in cooperation with audio software company Keilwerth Audio).
Additionally Manuel Schleis works as a tutor for "dance production" for example the "Roland Synth2Sound Tour", "SAE" & "Musikmesse Frankfurt".

Starting 2014, Schleis has abandoned making EDM tracks, to focus on his passion of producing soundsets with recorded samples only.

Sound Design

Sampling CDs/DVDs 

Manuel has done over 50 sampling CD's as Vengeance Sound, along with various other producers. Several of these packs include:

 Vengeance Analog Drums Vol.1
 Vengeance Dance Explosion Vol.1
 Vengeance Dance Explosion Vol.2
 Vengeance Deep House Vol.1
 Vengeance Deep House Vol.2
 Vengeance Dirty Electro Vol.1
 Vengeance Dirty Electro Vol.2
 Vengeance Dirty Electro Vol.3  
 Vengeance EDM Essentials Vol.1
 Vengeance EDM Essentials Vol.2
 Vengeance Effects Vol.1
 Vengeance Effects Vol.2
 Vengeance Effects Vol.3
 Vengeance Electro Essentials Vol.1
 Vengeance Electro Essentials Vol.2
 Vengeance Electro Essentials Vol.3
 Vengeance Essential Clubsounds Vol.1
 Vengeance Essential Clubsounds Vol.2
 Vengeance Essential Clubsounds Vol.3
 Vengeance Essential Clubsounds Vol.4
 Vengeance Essential Clubsounds Vol.5
 Vengeance Essential Deep House
 Vengeance Essential Dubstep Vol.1
 Vengeance Essential Dubstep Vol.2
 Vengeance Essential House Vol.1
 Vengeance Essential House Vol.2
 Vengeance Essential House Vol.3
 Vengeance Essential House Vol.4
 Vengeance Freakz On Beatz Vol.1
 Vengeance Freakz On Beatz Vol.2
 Vengeance Freakz On Beatz Vol.3
 Vengeance Future House Vol.1
 Vengeance Future House Vol.2
 Vengeance Future House Vol.3
 Vengeance Future House Vol.4
 Vengeance Minimal House
 Vengeance Minimal House Vol.2
 Vengeance Pop Essentials Vol.1
 Vengeance Pop Essentials Vol.2
 Vengeance Rhythm Guitars Vol.1
 Vengeance Rhythm Guitars Vol.2
 Vengeance Freakz On Beatz Vol.1
 Vengeance Freakz On Beatz Vol.2
 Vengeance Freakz On Beatz Vol.3
 Vengeance Trance Sensation Vol.1
 Vengeance Trance Sensation Vol.2
 Vengeance Trance Sensation Vol.3
 Vengeance Trance Sensation Vol.4 
 Vengeance Total Dance Sounds Vol.1
 Vengeance Total Dance Sounds Vol.2
 Vengeance Total Dance Sounds Vol.3
 Vengeance Ultimate Bass
 Vengeance Vocal Essentials Vol.1
 Vengeance Vocal Essentials Vol.2
 Vengeance Electroshock Vol.1
 Vengeance Electroshock Vol.2
 Vengeance Studio Vocals Vol.1
 Vengeance Trap Essentials Vol.1
 Vengeance Ultimate Fills Vol.1
 Vengeance Ultimate Fills Vol.2
 Vengeance Ultimate Fills Vol.3
 reFX Nexus1, Nexus2, Nexus3 & Nexus4

Nexus 1, 2, 3 & 4 are sample-based synthesizers (rompler) that, according to ReFX themselves, are actually more than just romplers.

Soundsets For Hardware/Software Synthesizers 

 Trance Source X (Access - all Virus models)
 Incubation V1 (Access - all Virus models)
 Incubation V2 (A - all Virus models)
 Incubation V3 (Access - all Virus models)
 Trance Source 2001 (Access - all Virus models)
 Vengeance Virus TI Factory Bank  (Access - Virus Ti)
 CS2x Sounds (Yamaha - CS2x)
 Vanguard Vengeance-Sound Factory Presets (reFX - Vanguard)
 Vanguard Soundset Part II (reFX - Vanguard)
 Gladiator Vengeance-Sound Factory Presets (Tone2 - Gladiator)
 Vengeance-Forum Soundset Vol.1 (Novation - V-Station)
 Vengeance-Forum Soundset Vol.2 (reFX - Vanguard)
 Vengeance-Forum Combfusion Soundset Vol.1 (Propellerheads - Reason)
 Vengeance-Forum Combfusion Soundset Vol.2 (Propellerheads - Reason)
 X-plorations Vol.1 (Roland - JP8000/JP8080)
 X-plorations Vol.2 (Roland - JP8000/JP8080)
 X-plorations Vol.3 (Roland - JP8000/JP8080)
 Blue Magic (Novation - Supernova 2, Supernova 1, Nova Laptop)
 Analog Meltdown (Waldorf - Pulse/Pulse+)
 Nordish by Nature (Clavia - Nordlead III)
 Trance & Dance Soundset for A1 (Cubase - A1)
 Cosmic X (Yamaha - CS6x/CS6r incl. PLG150AN)
 Q - Trilogy Vol.1 (Waldorf - Q+, Q, MicroQ/Komplexer)
 Q - Trilogy Vol.2 (Waldorf - Q+, Q, MicroQ/Komplexer)
 Club 4k part I - V-Station (Novation - V-Station)
 Club 4k part II - V-Station (Novation - V-Station)
 Analog Essentials (TC Powercore - Powercore 01)
 Prophecy (Native Instruments - Pro 53)
 Discovery Soundset Vol.1 (DiscoDSP - Discovery)
 Discovery (Pro) Soundset Vol.2 (DiscoDSP - Discovery Pro)
 Korg Legacy Soundset (Korg - Legacy Collection)
 Oddity Mini-Bass Soundset (GMedia - Oddity)
 Vengeance THOR Soundset (Reason 4.0 - THOR)
 Digital Atmosphere (Korg - Legacy Collection Digital Edition)
 Vengeance Electro Soundset for Massive (Native Instruments - Massive)
 Vengeance Moog Electrobass (Arturia - Minimoog V v2.0.1)
 Vengeance Producer Suite: Metrum Expansion 1 - Factory Extension
 Vengeance Producer Suite: Metrum Expansion 2 - Ultimate HipHop
 Vengeance Producer Suite: Metrum Expansion 3 - Future Kicks
 Vengeance Producer Suite: Metrum Expansion 4 - Blutonium Boy
 Vengeance Producer Suite: Metrum Expansion 5 - Electro House
 Vengeance Producer Suite: Metrum Expansion 6 - Hands Up Kicks

VST Plugins 
 Vengeance Producer Suite: Multiband Sidechain
 Vengeance Producer Suite: Metrum
 Vengeance Mastering Suite: Multiband Compressor
 Vengeance Producer Suite: Philta XL
 Vengeance Mastering Suite: Stereo Bundle
 Vengeance Producer Suite: Essential FX Bundle
 Vengeance Producer Suite: Phalanx
 Vengeance Producer Suite: Tape Stop
 Vengeance Producer Suite: Glitch Bitch
 Vengeance Producer Suite: Avenger
 ReFX Nexus 1
 ReFX Nexus 2
 ReFX Nexus 3
 ReFX Nexus 4
 ReFX QuadraSID
 ReFX PlastiCZ
 ReFX Vanguard

Discography

Releases (selection) 

 2003 Icarus - All Systems Go! / Extension Records
 2003 Phalanx - Flaming Skies / Illuminate Records
 2003 Ampire - Singularity / Overdose Records
 2003 Marc Jerome - Shake it / Everlasting Records
 2004 Reuter & Schleis - Passion / Alphabet City
 2004 Floorburner - Get Ready / DJ INC Records
 2004 Spoot - Take Control 2004 / Media Records
 2004 Kareema - Cool your Engines / Kontor Records
 2005 Aramanja - Memories / Waterworld Rec.
 2005 Denga & Manus - Cenwen / Asgard Records
 2005 Floorburner - Everybody Dance-Heaven / Yawa Recording
 2005 Spencer & Hill - Spencer & Hill EP vol.2 / Star Rouge Records
 2005 Scarf! - Hithouse One / Andorfine Records
 2005 Party Pimpz - Holiday / Aqualoop Records
 2006 Slice and Case - Abgedreht / Submental-ZYX

 2006 Phalanx - Symphony in Gminor / Illuminate Records
 2006 Ampire - Speedlimit / Traffic Tunes Records
 2007 Volition - Dimensions / Somatic Sense
 2007 Spencer & Hill - Get it On / Kontor
 2007 Em Slice vs Denga - So Sexy / Global Players Records
 2007 V-Headz - Paxi Fixi / Superstar-Chickenwings
 2007 Denga & Manus - E-Clipse / Red Silver Recordings
 2008 A-Lee feat. Amanda Wilson - Gotta Let Go / Oxyd Records
 2008 Culture Beat - Your Love / Superstar Records
 2008 Lowrider - Cool / Zooland Records
 2008 Vengeance - Temptation / Armada / ASOT
 2008 Spencer & Hill - Da Housebeat / Tiger Records
 2009 Vengeance - Dawn of the Uprising / Armada / ASOT
 2009 Spencer & Hill feat Dave Darell - Its a Smash / Zooland Records
 2009 Dabruck & Klein feat Michael Feines - The Feeling / WePlay

Remixes (selection) 

 2004 Klubbingman - Magic Summernight (Cascada vs Plazmatek Remix) / Sony Music
 2004 4 Strings - Turn it Around (Manyou Remix) / Alphabet City
 2004 Alphazone - Revelation (Phalanx Remix) / Nukleuz UK
 2004 Groove Coverage - Runaway (DJ Manian Remix) / Zeitgeist-Polydor
 2004 Pulsedriver - Slamming (Tune Up! Remix) / Aqualoop Records
 2004 Blank & Jones - Flowtation (Phalanx Remix) / Kontor Records
 2005 DJ Dean - Kick Da Bass (Ampire Remix) / Tunnel Records
 2005 DJ Shog - Jealousy (Denga & Manus Remix) / Logport Recordings
 2005 Lazard - Little Star (Cascada Remix) / Pultrance Rec.
 2006 Dumonde - Tomorrow 2006 (Observer & DJ Spacecase Remix) / F8T Records
 2006 Michael Gray - Borderline (Spencer & Hill Remix) / Eye Industries
 2006 Armand van Helden - Funk Phenomena 2k6Rmx / Submental Rec.
 2006 Ian Carey - Say What You Want (Spencer & Hill Remix) / KickFresh
 2006 Above & Beyond - For All I Care (Spencer & Hill Remix) / Anjunabeats
 2007 Scooter - Behind the Cow (Spencer & Hill Remix) / Kontor
 2007 Yanou feat. Edwyn Collins - A Girl Like You (S&H Project Remix) / Zooland Records
 2007 Liz Kay - When Love Becomes a Lie (Kareema Remix) / Zooland Records
 2007 Tiesto - Carpe Noctum (Spencer & Hill Remix) / Ultra Records

 2007 Yanou - King of My Castle (Spencer&Hill Remix) / Zooland Records
 2007 Hi Tack - Lets Dance (Dabruck & Klein Remix) / Superstar Rec.
 2007 Goodwill and Thommy Trah - Its a swede thing (Dabruck & Klein Remix) / Superstar Rec.
 2007 Noel Sinner - Pullover (Dabruck & Klein Remix) / Superstar Rec.
 2007 Eyerer & Chopstick - Make my Day (Dabruck & Klein Remix) / Superstar Rec.
 2007 Erick Morillo ft. P. Diddy - Dance I said (Spencer&Hil Remix) / OXYD Records
 2007 Axwell - Its true (Dabruck & Klein Remix) / Superstar Rec.
 2007 Yanou - Sun is Shining (Spencer & Hill Remix) / Zooland Records
 2008 Cascada - What Do You Want From Me (Spencer & Hill Remix) / Zooland Records
 2008 Moby - Disco Lies (Spencer & Hill Remix)
 2008 Public Enemy vs Benny Benassi - Bring the Noise (Dabruck & Klein Remix) / Superstar Rec.
 2008 Lorie - Play (Spencer & Hill Remix) / SonyBMG/Columbia
 2009 Paul van Dyk - For an Angel 2009 (Spencer & Hill Remix) / Vandit
 2009 Bob Sinclair feat. Sugarhill Gang - La La Song (Spencer & Hill Remix) / Vandetta
 2009 Dennis the Menace, Bigworld - The First Rebirth (Dabruck & Klein Remix) / Axtone Rec.
 2009 Royksopp - The Girl and the Robot (Spencer & Hill Remix) / EMI France

External links 

(Vengeance Sound)
(Manuel Schleis, Discogs profile)
(Computermusic interview)
(Spencer & Hill official homepage)
(complete discography)

German record producers
1979 births
Living people
German dance musicians